In France, rape is illegal, and marital rape is also illegal. In recent years there has been increase of reported rape cases in France.

Studies
Rape has been documented across French history. Georges Vigarello in his 2001 book writes about the history of rape in France, highlighting events from 16th to 20th century. He states that rape has historically been seen as a form of violence, but not punished as such.

Statistics

In 1971, the rate of declared rapes stood at 2.0 per 100,000 people. In 1995, it was 12.5. In 2009, it stood at 16.2.

According to a 2012 report, about 75,000 rapes take place each year. In 2012, there were 1,293 reported rapes in a population of 66 million, and 1,188 rapes in 2013 in a population of 66 million.

In 2015, rape rate for France was 20.1 cases per 100,000 population. Rape rate of France increased from 15.9 cases per 100,000 population in 2006 to 20.1 cases per 100,000 population in 2015 growing at an average annual rate of 2.72%.

Gang rape
According to a 2014 report, about 5,000 to 7,000 of the rapes are gang rapes. Gang-rapes are referred to as tournantes, or "pass-arounds". One of the first people to bring public attention to the culture of gang rape was Samira Bellil, who published a book called Dans l'enfer des tournantes ("In Gang Rape Hell").

Notable offenders
Gilles de Rais (1404–1440) - Convicted of rape, murder and torture, he was executed.
Pierre Chanal (1946–2003) - French soldier, convicted of rape and kidnapping, he received a ten-year jail sentence.
Émile Louis (1934–2013) - Sentenced to life imprisonment in 2004.
Michel Fourniret (1942–2021) - Convicted in 1987 for rape, and assault of minors.
Joseph Vacher (1869–1898) - Convicted of murder, rape. Executed in December 1898.
Roman Polanski (1933–) - Actor, convicted of raping a 13-year-old.
Guy Georges (1962–) - Raped and murdered about seven women. Sentenced to life imprisonment in 2001.

See also 
 Abortion in France
 Dans l'enfer des tournantes ("In Gang Rape Hell")
 Feminism in France
 Human rights in France
 LGBT rights in France
 Ministry of Women's Rights (France)
 Ni Putes Ni Soumises
 Rape of males
 Women's rights

General:
 Crime in France

Further reading

References

 
France
Crimes against women